Change My Ways may refer to:

Change My Ways, EP by Antiskeptic
"Change My Ways", song by Kodak Black Project Baby 2
"Change My Ways", song by Galactic from Crazyhorse Mongoose
"Change My Ways", song by Headstones Love + Fury
"Change My Ways", song by Flunk Personal Stereo
"Change My Ways", song by Ian Gillan Memoirs of a Common Man
"Change My Ways", song by Canned Heat from Hallelujah (album)
"Change My Ways", song by Stuck Moji from Snappin' Necks
"Change My Ways", song by Antiskeptic from One Eye to Morocco
"Change My Ways", song by The Pietasters from All Day (The Pietasters album)
"Change My Ways", song by Jordan Knight from Jordan Knight (album)
"Change My Ways", song by Leehom Wang from Change Me (album)